The Lady of the Valley (Sayyidat al-Wadi) is a Marian shrine inaugurated on 16 August 2009, located in Al-Nasirah, Wadi al-Nasara in Syria. The statue is built near the Lady of the Valley Church on top of Mount of the Pilgrim, which is dedicated to Saint George.

The figure which stands on a base that brings its height to 30 metres (98 ft), at an altitude of 980 metres (3215 ft) above sea level; completed on 16 August 2009.

See also
Convent of Our Lady of Saidnaya
Shrines to the Virgin Mary

References 

Shrines to the Virgin Mary
Marian devotions
Religious buildings and structures completed in 2009
Monuments and memorials in Syria
2009 establishments in Syria